Marcos Gustavo Pereira (born 25 April 1985 in Asunción, Paraguay) is a Paraguayan footballer currently playing for General Díaz of the Primera División in Paraguay.

Teams
  Sol de América 2008-2009
  Jorge Wilstermann 2009
  Sol de América 2010
  Deportes Copiapó 2011
  Sportivo Luqueño 2012
  General Díaz 2013–present

External links
 
 

1985 births
Living people
Paraguayan footballers
Paraguayan expatriate footballers
Sportivo Luqueño players
Club Sol de América footballers
Deportes Copiapó footballers
C.D. Jorge Wilstermann players
Primera B de Chile players
Expatriate footballers in Chile
Expatriate footballers in Bolivia
Association football midfielders